Blagovarsky District (Blagovar rayonı; , Bolğawar rayonı) is an administrative and municipal district (raion), one of the fifty-four in the Republic of Bashkortostan, Russia. It is located in the central western part of the republic and borders with Chekmagushevsky District in the north, Kushnarenkovsky District in the northeast, Chishminsky District in the east, Davlekanovsky District in the south, and with Buzdyaksky District in the west. Its administrative center is the rural locality (a selo) of Yazykovo. As of the 2010 Census, the total population of the district was 26,004, with the population of Yazykovo accounting for 24.5% of that number.

History
The district was established in 1935.

Administrative and municipal status
Within the framework of administrative divisions, Blagovarsky District is one of the fifty-four in the Republic of Bashkortostan. The district is divided into fifteen selsoviets, comprising eighty-seven rural localities. As a municipal division, the district is incorporated as Blagovarsky Municipal District. Its fifteen selsoviets are incorporated as fifteen rural settlements within the municipal district. The selo of Yazykovo serves as the administrative center of both the administrative and municipal district.

References

Notes

Sources

Districts of Bashkortostan
States and territories established in 1935